Oliver Proske (born 21 September 1971 in Johannesburg) is a German stage designer, industrial designer, exhibition designer, producer and managing director. In 1998 he founded the Berlin-based independent theatre company Nico and the Navigators together with his partner Nicola Hümpel.

Stage designs 

 1998 Ich war auch schon einmal in Amerika
 1999 Lucky Days, Fremder!
 2000 Eggs on Earth
 2001 Lilli in Putgarden
 2002 Der Fammileinrat
 2003 Kain, Wenn & Aber
 2004 HELden & KleinMUT
 2006 Wo Du nicht bist
 2007 Niels Arms and Songs
 2008 Obwohl ich dich kenne
 2009 Anæsthesia
 2009 Ombra & Luce
 2010 Orlando
 2011 Cantatatanz
 2011 Petite messe solennelle
 2012 Angels’ Share
 2012 Mahlermania
 2013 Shakespeare's Sonnets – Hate me when thou wilt
 2014 Die Befristeten
 2015 Die Stunde da wir zu viel voneinander wussten
 2016 Reigen
 2017 Silent Songs into the wild

Exhibitions 
 2008 Dinge der Welt
 2012 Cicadas

Product design 
 2001 Leuchte Melampos at ClassiCon

Bibliography
 Laura Berman, Madlene Therese Feyrer: Klang zu Gang – Gedanken zur Musik in heutigen Theaterformen. Theater der Zeit Verlag, Berlin, 2009, .
 Nico and the Navigators: An der Erde hängt der Mensch und an ihm der Himmel. Theater der Zeit Verlag, Berlin, 2013, .
 Babette Kraus: Die Berliner Performance/Theater-Gruppe Nico and The Navigators: Werkzyklus 'Menschenbilder' – Auf der Suche nach der verlorenen Identität. GRIN Verlag, München, 2002, 
 Torsten Maß, Christoph Werner: Theater der Welt: Komm! Ins Offene. Mitteldeutscher Verlag, Halle, 2008, .

References

External links
 Official homepage
 Renate Klett: Stimmen Sie für den Horizont! In: Die Zeit, 4 December 2003

1971 births
Living people
German scenic designers
German industrial designers
German theatre managers and producers